Máté Koroknai (born 13 January 1993) is a Hungarian athlete specialising in the 400 metres hurdles.

Personal life
From Debrecen he attended the University of Debrecen. He then attended the University of Nebraska and studied electric engineering between 2014 and 2017.

Career
In 2014 and 2015, as well as 2020 and 2021, Koroknai was the Hungarian champion in the 400 metres hurdles. He ran the 19th fastest time of 2020 worldwide, when he ran 49.71 on the 5 September 2020 in Székesfehérvár. It was a new personal best time and had come after a year long absence with an Achilles’ tendon injury.

At the 2020 Summer Olympics 400 metre hurdles race he ran 49.80 in the heats but did not qualify further.

References

1993 births
Living people
Hungarian male hurdlers
Hungarian Athletics Championships winners
Athletes (track and field) at the 2020 Summer Olympics
Olympic athletes of Hungary
Nebraska Cornhuskers athletes
Nebraska Cornhuskers men's track and field athletes
21st-century Hungarian people